"Playing doctor" is a phrase used colloquially in the Western world to refer to children examining each other's genitals. It originates from children using the pretend roles of doctor and patient as a pretext for such an examination. However, whether or not such role-playing is involved, the phrase is used to refer to any similar examination.

Playing doctor is distinguished from child-on-child sexual abuse because the latter is an overt and deliberate action directed at sexual stimulation, including orgasm, as compared to anatomical curiosity. Playing doctor is considered by most child psychologists to be a normal step in childhood development between the ages of approximately three and six years, so long as all parties are willing participants and relatively close in age. However, it can be a source of discomfort to parents to discover their children are engaging in such an activity. Parenting professionals often advise parents to view such a discovery as an opportunity to calmly teach their children about the differences between the sexes, personal privacy, and respecting the privacy of other children.

A study by American sexologist Alfred Kinsey published in the book Sexual Behavior in the Human Male (1948) found that 38.6% of all 10-year-old children practice heterosexual and homosexual doctor play.

See also 
 Child sexual abuse
 Child sexuality
 Genital play
 Make believe

References 

Child development
English phrases
Sexual anatomy
Child sexuality